Puente Don Manuel is a hamlet in the municipality of Alcaucín in the province of Málaga in the autonomous community of Andalusia in southern Spain. The hamlet has English shops, because a lot of English immigrants live in this region.

External links 
 Absolute Axarquia, Puente Don Manuel

Populated places in the Province of Málaga